Francisco José Nogueira Maneiro, known as Fran (born 4 August 1972) is a retired Spanish football striker.

References

1972 births
Living people
Spanish footballers
Racing de Ferrol footballers
Celta de Vigo B players
Leça F.C. players
Ciudad de Murcia footballers
CD Mirandés footballers
CD Logroñés footballers
FC Cartagena footballers
CD Ourense footballers
Association football forwards
Primeira Liga players
Spanish expatriate footballers
Expatriate footballers in Portugal
Spanish expatriate sportspeople in Portugal